, also known as Magical Girl Tickle or Tickle the Witch Girl, is a 1970s magical girl manga and anime by Go Nagai.  Unlike Nagai's earlier (and more popular) Cutie Honey, Majokko Tickle is closer to the more traditional mold of magical girl anime such as Sally the Witch. And unlike Nagai's other, more popular works, was created for an audience of pre-teen girls.

The anime television series was produced by Toei Dōga in association with Kaze Productions and Neomedia and animated by Nippon Sunrise. It consisted of 45 episodes and was aired across Japan on TV Asahi from March 6, 1978, to January 29, 1979.  It brought the magical girl genre of anime back to Japanese TV screens for the first time since Toei Animation's Majokko Megu-chan aired its final episode in September 1975. Some episodes were scripted by Masaki Tsuji, a longtime friend of Nagai's and head writer on his earlier series Devilman, Dororon Enma-kun, and Cutey Honey. Go Nagai also wrote the lyrics to the opening theme song.

Majokko Tickle is notable for being the first magical girl series to feature a "double hero" (Tickle and her human "sister" Tiko, or a "lucky pair" as they are referred to during the series). Reportedly the series was inspired in part by the popularity of Pink Lady. A female pop duo who were known for performing their songs and dancing in perfect unison. And who sold millions of records in Japan during the late 1970s (they also later had a minor hit in the United States called "Kiss in the Dark"). Pink Lady had an enormous audience of young girls, and Majokko Tickle was considered an opportunity to capitalize on the similarity.  In fact, one of Pink Lady's hits ("Southpaw") was featured in one episode, in which Tickle and her "sisters" Tiko and Hina watch the duo perform the song on TV. The Majokko tickle will be one of the last magical girls old series among Lun Lun and Lalabel and in fact the last before, Himitsu no Akko-chan remake, that is action takes places only in Japan, the next magical girl series Lun Lun and Lalabel will take place elsewhere. The refreshed series (with new intro and ending) shown in the times of Lun Lun and Lalabel and in 1979/1980 and in the time between February and October 1981 (together with Hello! Sandybell) would be the end for nearly a decade of old style magical girls created by Toei Animation and Nippon Sunrise.

Story

Tiko (a more direct romanization would be "Chiiko"), a shy Japanese schoolgirl, receives a book as a gift from her father on her eleventh birthday. When Tiko opens the book, she releases Tickle ("Chikkuru"), a mischievous fairy who was imprisoned inside the book for playing pranks on people. At first Tiko doesn't believe Tickle is a witch, and tells her to prove it. So Tickle delivers Tiko's scarf to her friend Mico (who had just moved to Hokkaido, and promised to be around for Tiko's birthday). Once Tiko realizes the truth, she is happy to befriend Tickle. Tickle casts a spell, and Tiko is surprised when her mother tells her and her "sister" Tickle to come down for dinner. Tickle reveals that in order to avoid awkward questions about where she came from, she will pass herself off as Tiko's twin sister. Tickle uses her powers to solve everyday problems and, of course, to continue playing tricks on people (particularly Tiko's annoying kid sister, Hina).

Like other magical girls, Tickle has a special phrase she uses to cast a spell; hers is: "Maharu Tamara Furampa." (translated as "Sparkle, Twinkle, Magic will be.")

Although the series is mostly light-hearted and whimsical, there are some serious parts, such as children being teased for being overweight or ugly. The series also features a reversal of expectations, as Tickle is from another world, and has her own way of doing things.

Characters

Lucky Pair
  Voiced by: Rihoko Yoshida
 A mischievous fairy who was imprisoned in a book for playing tricks before being freed by Tiko (although she claims to be a magical princess on the run from a dragon). She decides to stay around for a while, and uses her magic to manipulate everyone's memories, making them believe she has always been Tiko's twin sister. Although she loves playing tricks, she doesn't hesitate to use her magic to solve problems. But being part of a family is a new experience for Tickle, and magic can't solve problems she doesn't understand. She has pony tails as hair dressing. She is between 10–11 years. Tickle was renamed Lilli in the Italian dub.
 Tico  Voiced by: Yoko Asagami (except in the last episode when Keiko Han had to fill in for her)
 A very shy girl, she is the one who freed Tickle, and now lives with her, posing as twins. She had just lost her best friend when she received the book containing Tickle. She is  usually against Tickle's use of magic.   She is 11–12 years. Tiko was renamed Mirtilla in the Italian dub, and in the French version her name was semi-romanized to Cheko.

Family
  Voiced by: Toyoko Komazawa
 The very annoying sister of Tiko and (she believes) Tickle. She loves nothing more than butting into whatever her "sisters" are doing. She often gets her comeuppance via Tickle's magic. Naturally, nobody believes her when she claims to have seen Tickle using magic. 
  Voiced by: Hiroshi Ohtake
 The father of Tiko, Hina and (he believes) Tickle. The one who gave Tiko the book containing Tickle. 
  Voiced by: Haruko Kitahama
 The mother of Tiko, Hana and (she believes) Tickle. A loving and kind woman.

Elementary school

Tickle's classmates
  Voiced by: Hiroshi Ohtake
 The fat trouble maker at Tickle and Tiko's school (similar to Boss in Nagai's Mazinger Z). He has two friends (or "underlings") - Ago and Pochi. They all befriend Tickle and Tiko.
  Voiced by: Isamu Tanonaka
 One of Donta's two best friends.
  Voiced by: Sachiko Chijimatsu
 One of Donta's two best friends.
  Voiced by: Keiko Yamamoto
 The heavy-set girl in Tiko and Tickle's class. She is teased at school for her weight. Tickle encourages her to do her best. 
  Voiced by: Keiko Yamamoto
 Serious and handsome boy who's a class representative.
  Voiced by: Haruko Kitahama
 The resident "rich-girl". She is very snobby, and usually causes problems for Tiko.

Other students
  Voiced by: Akira Kamiya
 A boy that Tickle and Tiko both have a crush on.

Teachers and school staff
  Voiced by: Hiroshi Masuoka
 Tickle and Tiko's teacher. He is very silly, and clumsy. Takakura-sensei has a crush on Hanamura-sensei. 
  Voiced by Kazuko Sugiyama
 The beautiful teacher at Tiko and Tickle's school.
  Voiced by Shunji Yamada
  Voiced by Jōji Yanami

Magic Kingdom
 
 The king of the Magic Kingdom. He is green, red and white, and has a magical wand. He appears in the last episode, demanding Tickle to return.

Distribution

Perhaps because it is aimed at a substantially younger demographic than Go Nagai's other creations, Majokko Tickle is one of Nagai's most obscure works. Nevertheless, the series was dubbed into other languages and broadcast in several other countries, including Italy (Lilli, un guaio tira l'altro), France (Magique Tickle, drole de fee or "Tickle the Funny Fairy"), Turkey, and Poland (Magiczne Igraszki). In Italy, the opening theme song was an instrumental version of the original Japanese theme by Mitsuko Horie, and the Polish version (aired on Polonia 1) retains the original Japanese vocal themes, but an entirely different song was used in the French version. The Polish dub is peculiar in that it does not feature actual Polish voice actors, but simply a reading of Polish-language dialogue by a female voiceover artist over the original Japanese dialogue. Both the Italian and French dub have completely new music and SFX, possibly because Toei didn't have the original materials. A Spanish dub, titled Cosquillas Mágicas, was also shown in Spain on the Antena 3 network.

Since the copyright of the series belongs to Toei Co. Ltd. and not Toei Animation, a VHS and LD release was not possible. Also, because of this situation, Tickle's appearance in the 1999 Role-playing video game Majokko Daisakusen: Little Witching Mischiefs (which featured magical girls from Toei Animation TV series from 1966–1981, including Cutie Honey, Megu-chan, Sally, Akko-chan among others), was not possible. After several years, the series has finally been released for the home video market by Toei Video in Japan in 4 DVD sets of two discs between 2005 and 2006.

Anime staff 

(Source: Anime News Network; Anime Memorial, The Anime Encyclopedia by Jonathan Clements and Helen McCarthy)

 Original creator: Go Nagai
 Series director: Takashi Kuoka
 Direction: Atsushi Takagi, Tôru Sakata, Takashi Hisaoka, Tôru Sakata, Yûji Uchida, Kenji Nakano, Fumio Tashiro
 Script: Mitsuru Majima, Tatsuo Tamura, Yoshimi Shinozaki, Sukehiro Tomita, Hirohisa Soda, Akiyoshi Sakai, Naoko Miyake, Masaki Tsuji, Kunihiko Yuyama, Kôzô Takagaki, Yû Yamamoto, Toyohiro Andô, Tomoko Konparu
 Storyboard: Hideo Yamada, Atsushi Takagi, Shûji Iuchi, Hiroshi Ashibe, Katsutoshi Sasaki, Kunihiko Yuyama, Watake Na
 Character designs: Hiroshi Takahisa, Osamu Motohara
 Animation directors: Takeshi Tamazawa, Yûji Uchida, Kanji Hara, Masuo Ani, Yoshiteru Kobayashi, Otojirô Katô
 Backgrounds: Shin Kato
 Music: Takeo Watanabe
 Theme song lyrics: Go Nagai (OP), Saburo Yatsude (a pseudonym for the collective Toei - not Toei Animation - staff) (ED)
 Theme song performance: Mitsuko Horie (OP- Majokko Tickle, ED- Tickle and Tiko's Cha-cha-cha)
 Production: Neomedia/Nippon Sunrise/Kaze Pro for Toei Company Ltd.

External links 
Majokko Tickle  at allcinema

Majokko Tickle at Animemorial
Majokko Tickle  at Viva! Dynamic website
Overview and review of the series
Magique Tickle overview and review 

1978 anime television series debuts
Go Nagai
Magical girl anime and manga
Sunrise (company)
Shogakukan manga
Akita Shoten manga